Kollage is the debut studio album by the American hip-hop artist, Bahamadia. The album was released on April 2, 1996, by Chrysalis Records. Kollage peaked at number 3 on the Billboard Heatseekers, a music chart that features up-and-coming recording artists.

Track listing

A bonus track featuring Ursula Rucker titled "Path to Rhythm" is on the digital and European CD releases.

Samples
"Intro"
"Please Set Me at Ease" by Bobbi Humphrey
"Wordplay"
"Cucumber Slumber" by Weather Report
"Funk Times Three" by Paul Jackson, Jr.
"My Mind Spray" by Jeru the Damaja
"Spontaneity"
"Uzuri" by Catalyst
"Rugged Ruff"
"Who Is She (And What Is She to You)" by Gladys Knight & the Pips
"Halftime" by Nas
"I Confess"
"Let's Get It On" by Marvin Gaye
"Total Wreck"
"Magnificent Sanctuary Band" by Donny Hathaway
"Flow Joe" by Fat Joe
"Da Jawn"
"That's the Joint" by Funky 4+1
"Innovation"
"Electric Lush" by The John Payne Band
"3 The Hard Way"
"The Champ" by The Mohawks
"Get Up, Get Into It, Get Involved" by James Brown
"El Shabazz" by LL Cool J
"True Honey Buns"
"Don't Fight My Love" by The Ohio Players

Personnel
 Bahamadia, Lil' Cess, P.A.N., Redhanded, Ski, Nou, K. Williams, K. Akins (vocals)
 Base Corey "Funky Fingers" Stoot (guitar, bass guitar)
 N.O. Joe, JoJo (keyboards)
 Preston "P-Funk" Middleton (bass guitar)
 X-Cetra, Karen Bernod (background vocals)
 DJ Premier, Guru, Da Beatminerz, N.O. Joe, SKI, Redhanded, The Roots (production)
 Carlos Bess, Karyn Walsh, Eddie Sancho, Joe Quinde, Tim Latham (engineers)

Charts

References

External links
 

1996 debut albums
Bahamadia albums
Chrysalis Records albums
East Coast hip hop albums
Albums produced by DJ Premier
Albums produced by Da Beatminerz
Albums produced by Ski Beatz
Albums produced by N.O. Joe
Albums produced by Guru